Vico is a commune in the Corse-du-Sud department of France on the island of Corsica.

The Sagone river flows through the commune from east to west, entering the sea in the village of Sagone.
Sagone used to be the seat of a diocese, but by 1751 the town of Sagone was in ruins and uninhabited due to raids by Barbary pirates.  
The bishop lived inland in Vico, then a small town of some 800 inhabitants, under the civil government of Genoa. 
The corporation of the Cathedral Chapter still existed, with two dignities and six canons. 
In Vico there was one monastery of men.

Population

Sights
Torra di Sagone

See also
Communes of the Corse-du-Sud department

References

Communes of Corse-du-Sud
Corse-du-Sud communes articles needing translation from French Wikipedia